MCA Inc. (originally an initialism for Music Corporation of America) was an American media conglomerate founded in 1924. Originally a talent agency with artists in the music business as clients, the company became a major force in the film industry, and later expanded into television production. MCA published music, booked acts, ran a record company, represented film, television, and radio stars, and eventually produced and sold television programs to the three major television networks, especially NBC.

MCA was the legal predecessor of Vivendi Universal and thereby NBCUniversal. Its other legal successor is Universal Music Group Holding Corp, a holding company owned by Universal Music Group (which has absorbed PolyGram).

History

Early years
MCA was formed in 1924 by Jules Stein and William R. Goodheart, Jr., as Music Corporation of America, a music booking agency based in Chicago, Illinois. MCA helped pioneer modern practices of touring bands and name acts. Early on, MCA booked such prominent artists as King Oliver and Jelly Roll Morton for clubs and speakeasies run by legendary notorious Chicago mobsters such as Al Capone and others.

Lew Wasserman joined MCA in 1936 at the age of 23 and rose through the ranks of MCA for more than four decades, with Sonny Werblin as his right-hand man. Wasserman helped create MCA's radio show, Kay Kyser's Kollege of Musical Knowledge, which debuted on NBC Radio that same year. Following that success, Stein installed Wasserman in New York City in 1937, but Wasserman convinced him that Hollywood was the best place for the company's growth.

The company was guided by a codification of Stein's pet policies known as "The Rules of The Road". The Rules were passed down from the Prohibition era, Chicago–area MCA (referenced in Citizen Cohn and The King and Queen of Hollywood books) to the 1940s Los Angeles–area firm, which focused on representing movie actors.  The Rules were next passed to the 1950s generation of MCA talent agents, including Jerry Perenchio, who later owned and headed a number of businesses including Univision from 1992 to 2007 . Perenchio is well known for his version of the Rules (now up to twenty rules), which vary from year to year and have some internal contradictions (Perenchio pointed out that while there is a "no nepotism" rule, he is aware his son was on the board of directors at the time).

In 1939, MCA's headquarters moved from Chicago to Beverly Hills, California, creating a movie division and beginning to acquire talent agencies and represent established actors such as James Stewart, Henry Fonda, Bette Davis, and Ronald Reagan, whom Wasserman became very close with personally. In later decades, Wasserman became a guiding force in Reagan's political ambition by helping Reagan to win the presidency of the Screen Actors Guild (SAG), then election as Governor of California in 1966, and finally President of the United States in 1980.

By the end of the 1930s, MCA had become the largest talent agency in the world, with over 700 clients, including movie stars, recording artists, Broadway actors, radio stars, and directors. Its aggressive acquisition of its clientele in all entertainment sectors earned MCA the nickname of The Octopus. This behavior led U.S. Department of Justice agents to investigate not only whether MCA was a monopoly breaking antitrust laws, but also its suspected connections to underworld criminal activities. This investigation continued for the next few decades.

Revue Productions and the early days of television
In 1948, Jules Stein moved up as MCA's first chairman, giving Lew Wasserman charge of day-to-day operations of the company as president. That year, Stein and Wasserman decided to get into a new medium that would soon change the entertainment industry: television. Although many motion picture studios would not touch this new medium, thinking it was just a fad and would fade away, MCA decided to embrace it. First, however, the company needed to get a waiver from the Screen Actors Guild, which ruled at the time that talent agencies such as MCA were prohibited from producing TV shows or films. Thanks to the newly elected SAG president, Ronald Reagan, MCA was granted a waiver to start producing TV shows.

After the waiver was granted, the company formed MCA Television Limited for syndication. In 1950 Revue Productions, once a live concert promotion division that produced "Stage Door Canteen" live events for the USO during World War II, was re-launched as MCA's television production subsidiary. By 1956, Revue became the top supplier of television for all broadcast networks, spanning three decades of television programs such as Armour Theater, General Electric Theater, Leave It to Beaver, Wagon Train, and many others. Prior to 1958, all Revue's shows were filmed at the old Republic Pictures studio lot in Studio City, California.

In February 1958, MCA acquired Paramount Pictures' pre-1950 sound feature film library through a newly created MCA subsidiary, EMKA, Ltd.

In December 1958, MCA bought the  Universal Studios lot from Universal Pictures for $11,250,000 and renamed it, as well as the actual television unit, Revue Studios. As part of the deal, MCA leased the studios back to Universal for $2 million a year, plus unlimited access to MCA's clients such as Jimmy Stewart, Rock Hudson, Doris Day and Alfred Hitchcock to make films for Universal.

Stein, who by this time was the sole owner of MCA, decided to take the company public by giving 51% of his ownership of MCA to his employees, which included a 20% stake for Wasserman. The company went public on the New York Stock Exchange and was incorporated as MCA Inc. on November 10, 1958. A couple of years later, Alfred Hitchcock gave MCA his rights to Psycho and his television anthology in exchange for 150,000 shares, making him the third largest investor in MCA, and his own boss at Universal.

Takeover of Universal Studios and Decca Records
On June 18, 1962, Decca Records shareholders agreed to MCA's buyout offer after the record label had entered into talks about a merger that April. Decca at the time owned Coral Records and Brunswick Records, and an 89% stake in Universal Pictures Company, Inc. On July 13, 1962, the Department of Justice filed suit against MCA, charging that its acquisition of Decca's controlling interest in Universal violated antitrust laws. MCA would have to close its talent agency, which represented most of the industry's biggest names, in order to retain Universal. In reality, the agency became defunct the day the DOJ filed suit; dissolving it that October was a mere formality. MCA's now-former agents quickly formed new talent agencies, many of which are woven into the corporate fabric of today's talent management. Jerry Perenchio's Chartwell Artists represented Elizabeth Taylor and Muhammad Ali. By the end of 1962, MCA assumed full ownership of Universal.

In 1964, MCA entered the music publishing business when it acquired Lou Levy's Leeds Music, and formed Universal City Studios the same year in effort to merge under one umbrella both Universal Pictures and its Revue Studios division, which was later reincorporated as Universal Television in 1966.

On July 15, 1964, MCA established the Studio Tour, which provided guests a sneak peek behind-the-scenes glimpse at movie and television production at the backlot of Universal Studios. This established a footprint of what is known today as the Universal Studios Hollywood film studio and theme park. Over the next few decades, similar parks were built and expanded under MCA for Universal Orlando Resort in Orlando, Florida and Universal Studios Japan in Osaka, Japan.

In 1966, MCA formed Uni Records in Hollywood, California, and in 1967, MCA bought New York–based Kapp Records. That same year MCA also acquired guitar maker Danelectro and mall retailer Spencer Gifts.

Later years
In 1967, the MCA Records label was established outside the United States and Canada to issue releases by the MCA group of labels. Decca, Kapp and Uni were merged into MCA Records at Universal City, California in 1971; the three labels maintained their identities for a short time but were soon retired in favor of the MCA label. The first MCA Records release in the US was former Uni artist Elton John's "Crocodile Rock" in 1972. In 1973, the final Decca pop label release, "Drift Away", a #5 pop hit by Dobie Gray, was issued.

MCA had two failed mergers in 1969. Initially it planned a merger with Westinghouse Electric Corporation but that collapsed in April and in July, they announced a proposed merger with the Firestone Tire and Rubber Company but this too was called off in September.

In 1973, Stein stepped down from the company he founded and Wasserman took over as chairman and chief executive officer, while Sidney Sheinberg was appointed president and chief operating officer of MCA. Other executives within MCA were Lawrence R. Barnett, who ran the agency's live acts division during its glory agency years in the 1950s and 1960s, and Ned Tanen, head of Universal Pictures. Tanen was behind Universal hits such as Animal House, John Hughes's Sixteen Candles and The Breakfast Club.

MCA issued soundtrack albums for most films released by Universal Pictures.

In 1975, the company entered the book publishing business with the acquisition of G. P. Putnam's Sons. In 1979, it acquired ABC Records along with its subsidiaries Paramount Records, Impulse! Records, and Dot Records. ABC had acquired the Paramount and Dot labels when it purchased Gulf+Western's record labels in 1974, then the parent company of Paramount Pictures.

From 1983 to 1989, Irving Azoff was chairman of MCA Records and is credited for turning around the fortunes of the label.

The Chess Records catalog was acquired from the remnants of Sugarhill in 1985. Motown Records was bought in 1988 (and sold to PolyGram in 1993). GRP Records (which became for some years MCA's jazz music label and thus began managing the company's jazz catalogue) and Geffen Records (which served as another mainstream music subsidiary) were acquired in 1990.

MCA also acquired other assets outside of the music industry. It became a shareholder in USA Network in 1981, eventually owning 50% of the network (the other half was owned by Paramount). In 1982, its publishing division, G. P. Putnam's Sons, bought Grosset & Dunlap from Filmways. In 1984, MCA bought Walter Lantz Productions and its characters, including Woody Woodpecker. In 1985, MCA bought toy and video game company LJN. It also bought a TV station in New York City, WWOR-TV (renamed from WOR-TV), in 1987, from RKO General subsidiary of GenCorp, which was in the midst of a licensing scandal.

In 1983, MCA Videogames, the video game division of MCA itself and video game developer/publisher Atari Inc. entered into a partnership to start out Studio Games, a joint venture that would develop video games based on MCA's film and television properties, most notably from then-sister Universal Pictures, and decided that they would gave them access to all motion picture and television properties coming from the unit.

On November 26, 1990, Japanese multinational conglomerate Matsushita Electric agreed to acquire MCA for US$6.59 billion. MCA was forced to sell WWOR-TV in 1991 to Pinelands, Inc. because of the Federal Communications Commission (FCC) rules that foreign companies could not own over 25% of a U.S. TV station.

In 1995, Seagram acquired 80% of MCA from Matsushita. On November 26, 1996, MCA announced that it would acquire television syndication company Multimedia Entertainment from Gannett, whom acquired its parent company in 1995, for $40 million. On December 9, 1996, the new owners dropped the MCA name; the company became Universal Studios, Inc., and its music division, MCA Music Entertainment Group, was renamed Universal Music Group. MCA Records continued to live on as a label within the Universal Music Group. The following year, G. P. Putnam's Sons was sold to the Penguin Group subsidiary of Pearson PLC.

In 1996, MCA filed a lawsuit against Viacom over the latter's launch of the TV Land cable network. Viacom had purchased Paramount in 1994, and the contract for USA Network prohibited either of their owners from owning cable channels outside the joint venture. Viacom had owned MTV Networks (the parent of TV Land) since 1985. The suit was settled when Viacom sold MCA its half of the joint venture. TV Land eventually added shows from the MCA/Universal library in 1999.

On May 21, 1998, Seagram acquired PolyGram from Philips and merged it with its music holdings. The European Commission approved the merger on September 21, 1998. When France-based Pernod Ricard purchased Seagram's drinks business, Pernod sold its media holdings (including Universal) to Vivendi, which became Vivendi Universal in 2000.

In the spring of 2003, MCA Records was folded into Geffen Records. Its country music label, MCA Nashville Records, is still in operation. MCA's classical music catalog is managed by Deutsche Grammophon.

MCA's non-music assets at the time of the company's renaming, including Universal Studios and the 50% interest in USA Network, came under ownership of NBC Universal (now full owner of USA), which was 80% owned by General Electric, and 20% owned by Vivendi. In 2009, GE struck a deal to buy Vivendi's interest, and sold a controlling 51% interest to Comcast afterwards. The sale completed on January 28, 2011, with General Electric owning 49% of the newly formed NBCUniversal. Comcast bought GE's stake two years later.

The landmark Paul Williams–designed Beverly Hills property that MCA once occupied became the headquarters of Paradigm Talent Agency until 2018. Conference rooms inside the building are named after Jules Stein and Lew Wasserman in honor of the legendary occupants.

See also
 LaserDisc
 MCA Records
 MCA Whitney Recording Studio
 NBCUniversal
 Seagram
 Vivendi

References 

Defunct mass media companies of the United States
Home video companies of the United States
Television production companies of the United States

Predecessors of NBCUniversal
Defunct companies based in Chicago
Entertainment companies based in California
American companies established in 1924
Entertainment companies established in 1924
Mass media companies established in 1924
Mass media companies disestablished in 1996
1924 establishments in Illinois
1996 disestablishments in Illinois
1924 establishments in California
1996 disestablishments in California
History of Chicago
Universal Music Group
Universal Pictures
Former Vivendi subsidiaries
Comcast